1993 World Ice Hockey Championships may refer to:
 1993 Men's World Ice Hockey Championships
 1993 World Junior Ice Hockey Championships